The 2nd IAAF World Indoor Championships in Athletics were held at the Budapest Sportcsarnok in Budapest, Hungary from March 3 to March 5, 1989. There were a total number of 373 participating athletes from 62 countries.

Results

Men
1985 | 1987  | 1989 | 1991 | 1993

Women
1985 | 1987 | 1989 | 1991 | 1993

Medal table

Participating nations

 (1)
 (1)
 (1)
 (7)
 (6)
 (4)
 (4)
 (2)
 (1)
 (2)
 (8)
 (9)
 (1)
 (12)
 (2)
 (4)
 (1)
 (14)
 (1)
 (9)
 (10)
 (2)
 (3)
 (9)
 (14)
 (3)
 (17)
 (4)
 (25)
 (1)
 (1)
 (4)
 (2)
 (11)
 (1)
 (6)
 (5)
 (1)
 (2)
 (4)
 (5)
 (8)
 (2)
 (2)
 (9)
 (3)
 (10)
 (2)
 (2)
 (28)
 (14)
 (3)
 (2)
 (2)
 (2)
 (36)
 (1)
 (1)
 (21)
 (3)
 (2)

See also
1989 in athletics (track and field)

External links
GBR Athletics
Athletics Australia

 
IAAF World Indoor Championships
IAAF World Indoor Championships
World Athletics Indoor Championships
International athletics competitions hosted by Hungary
International sports competitions in Budapest
March 1989 sports events in Europe
1980s in Budapest